Ioannis Malachias (also spelled Malahias and often referred to as Dr Malachias) was born in Xylosyrtis, Ikaria, in 1880 and died in Agios Kirykos, Ikaria, in 1958. He was a Greek doctor from Ikaria and was the leader of the Ikarian Revolution against the Ottoman Empire in 1912, serving as the first and only president of the Free State of Ikaria between 17 July and 4 November 1912.

References 

Greek physicians
Greek revolutionaries
Greeks from the Ottoman Empire
People from Icaria
Greek politicians
presidents